Lunchtime is around midday, when a meal is eaten.

Lunchtime may also refer to:

 Lunchtime (horse) (1970–1991), British Thoroughbred racehorse and sire
 "Lunchtime", a 2021 song by Spacey Jane